Izhevsk Radio Plant is a company based in Izhevsk, Russia and established in 1958.

The Izhevsk Radio Plant Production Association, a producer of instrumentation for the Soviet military and space programs, currently produces satellite navigation and communications systems, telemetry systems, and radio equipment for civilian uses, as well as medical equipment and other products.

References

External links
 Official website

Manufacturing companies of Russia
Companies based in Udmurtia
Electronics companies established in 1958
Ministry of General Machine-Building (Soviet Union)
1958 establishments in Russia
Electronics companies of the Soviet Union